Mormon Mesa is a mesa between the Virgin River and the Muddy River in Clark County, southern Nevada.

Mormon Mesa Area of Critical Environmental Concern
The  Mormon Mesa Desert Tortoise Area of Critical Environmental Concern (Mormon Mesa ACEC), protects habitat of the Desert tortoise , an endangered species.   The Delamar Mountains Wilderness Area encompasses a portion of the Mormon Mesa Desert Tortoise ACEC. The ACEC is composed primarily of creosote-bursage scrub and mixed Mojave shrub plant communities.

Double Negative by Michael Heizer
Double Negative, the Land art sculpture created by renowned contemporary artist Michael Heizer in 1969, is located on an edge of Mormon Mesa, near Overton. It was donated by art collector and pioneer art gallerist Virginia Dwan to the Los Angeles Museum of Contemporary Art  (MOCA), and is accessible to the public.

See also

References

Landforms of Clark County, Nevada
Mesas of the United States
Protected areas of the Mojave Desert
Protected areas of Clark County, Nevada
Protected areas of the Great Basin
Bureau of Land Management areas in Nevada